The Marraco  is a dragon or frightening creature in Catalan myth in the city of Lleida. It possessed a mouth wide enough to swallow a human whole according to tales told to frighten children.

Nomenclature 

Etymology 

There has been made a claim that the term marraco is a borrowing from the Basque word meaning 'dragon', but no linguistic sources have been cited.

The Catalan word marraco (regional variant of ) also denotes a type of shark, and the corresponding Basque word marraxo meaning 'shark' appears to be borrowed from the Spanish marrajo, according to a linguistic authority.

Catalan marraco, marranxo, etc., is cognate with Castilian  and Portuguese marraxo. The marraxo spelling is also attested in the writings of the Andalusian priest Pedro de Valderrama (1550–1611), where he comments that the marraxo is one among other "monstrous fish" in the sea, such as the whale, seal, dragon.

The Catalan word marraco also held the meaning of a 'large bull' according to one gloss, and Balearic Catalan (Mallorcan) marraco meant 'shy/wild' by transference from the meaning of a 'boar'. Attempts have been made to etymologically connect these cognates to Spanish morrano meaning 'pig/swine'. However, these etymological inquiries do not directly remark on marraco in the sense of a fantastical beast.

History

Ancient origins?  
The dragon has been used as totem creature in the region of Lleida since the 5th century BC. The ancient Ilergetes people who lived in the region regarded their chieftains to have descended from the marraco, their dragon deity, according to one source.

The source which makes this ancient origins claim also describes the marraco as "a wingless green monster with sharp fangs and a twisted snout, spitting fire from its jaws", writing as if such lore existed since antiquity. However, this is contradicted by a different authority, which notes that it was the advent of the marraco prop built in 1907 for the parade which "gave shape and color to this imaginary creature". The green dragon prop set on wheels (cf. photographs above or illustration) has been rigged with the ability to emit smoke from its nostrils, but was not equipped with the ability to simulate fire-breathing.

Middle Ages to Post-Medieval 

One recorded post-medieval precursor of "Lo Marraco de Lleida" was the drac or dragon figure used by the city during the procession of the Assumption of Mary for the year in 1551. There is also record of a "drach" which was ordered to be built in 1671 by the General Council to help out in the procession, and this has also been characterized by an antecedent to the Marraco.

In Lleidan lore, the Marraco was long employed by adults as one of  "scare children" beings frightening mishaving children into obedience. It is described as having a giant mouth capable of swallowing children whole.

20th century 
The first bona fide "Lo Marraco de Lleida" effigy for processions was crafted in 1907, and several incarnations of it has appeared intermittently for various major festivals over the years since then. Besides the Corpus Christi, the observation of the feast day of St.  (11 May) is another typical day when the Marraco is brought out. It made an appearance on Saint George's Day in 2020.

This first version was on active duty regularly for consecutive years from 1907 to 1912, then made a final appearance in 1915. It was set on wheels, that is to say, mounted on a hearse-cart. The original plaster coating over the wooden framework was destroyed by thunderstorm and had to be hastily replaced with parchment paper before the presentation prior to the city's , for Sant Anastasi's feast on 11 May.

After a period of hiatus, a replacement was constructed in 1941, but the dragon, which was plaster-cast on wire body mounted on a truck chassis was so heavy and unwieldly that it needed a large number of men pushing it to propel it, so that it fell into disuse.

This version was not just placed on an automobile chassis but was motorized (though this meant that the feature of gobbling up children had to be sacrificed). The dragon was now driven through the streets by the driver, and two other men rode on it to operate its body so that it could swing its neck and move its head and  jaws. The eyes were made to flash, and a horrifying scream came out of it (which were sound recordings on magnetic tape, amplified through a loudspeaker), and fumes were emitted from its nostrils. But it lacked the sort of spectacular pyrotechnics (fire-spitting) equpped on other parade dragons of Catalonia, and its enormous size serves to impress the crowd instead.

The current Marraco was rebuilt in 1993 based on the 1957 design; the old body made of plaster, wire mesh, and wood was replaced with a replica using fiberglass (Joan Miró is credited with this improvement though he died in 1983). This dragon also sits wheels and driven through the streets like a vehicle.

Explanatory notes

References 
Citations

Bibliography

 
 
 

Catalan mythology
European dragons
Catalan legendary creatures